Melanotaenia parkinsoni, the orange rainbowfish, is a species of rainbowfish in the subfamily Melanotaeniinae. It endemic to the western lakes of Papua New Guinea, specifically the Kemp Welsh River and Milne Bay.

Description

The species is a large and muscular rainbowfish, generally attaining a length . Individuals are a dark lavender colour at the basic level with a rosy chest. Males have deeper bodies than the females, and have extended fins, as well as the back half of their bodies being coated in a reflective golden-orange.

References

parkinsoni